The Queen Regent's Prerogative Act 1554 was an Act of the Parliament of England.

The whole Act was repealed by section 1 of, and Part I of the Schedule to, the Statute Law (Repeals) Act 1969.

References
Halsbury's Statutes,

Acts of the Parliament of England (1485–1603)
1554 in law
1554 in England